Peter Queally (born February 19, 1985) is an Irish mixed martial artist currently competing in Bellator's Lightweight division.  A professional competitor since 2012, he has also competed for Extreme Fighting Championship, BAMMA, Cage Warriors and Fight Nights Global.

Background
Born in Dungarven, Co. Waterford he is currently fighting out of Dublin, Ireland, he is a member of SBG Ireland with head coach John Kavanagh with notable teammates such as Conor McGregor, Artem Lobov & Gunnar Nelson. He is the owner/coach of SBG in Naas, Co. Kildare.

Mixed martial arts career

Early career 
Queally began training Brazilian jiu-jitsu at the age of 21, where he eventually achieved his blue belt.

Queally held an amateur record of 4–1 since the beginning of his Mixed Martial Artist career in 2010. Queally made his professional MMA debut in European based promotion Cage Contenders in 2012 and won via unanimous decision against opponent Kieran O'Donnell. Queally would quickly obtain three decision wins on the regional scene before making the step up to Cage Warriors, where he lost his first fight. Queally fought in South Africa for Extreme Fighting Championship, before fighting in Italy and Poland, where he won both of his fights.

In 2016 Queally had two bouts in BAMMA, where he went 1-1.

Fight Nights Global 
Then, in 2017 came a series of bouts under the Fight Night Global banner which saw him compete in Russia and Kazakhstan. In his first bout, Queally faced Igor Egorov at  Fight Nights Global 64 on April 27, 2017. He won the bout via unanimous decision.

After losing a close majority decision to Islam Begidov at Fight Nights Global 72, Queally faced Kuat Khamitov at Fight Nights Global 80. After the bout was originally ruled a majority decision win for Kuat, the bout was overturned to a draw by the Russian MMA Union after they decided that Khamitov did no damage with the takedowns and rarely looked like he was in control of Queally at any point. Arguably, Queally did more damage in his defensive positions than Khamitov did looking to secure the Irishman on his back.

His stint in Fight Nights Global culminated in a sensational first-round finish of the then 24-3 Armenian standout David Khachatryan at Fight Nights Global 87: Khachatryan vs. Queally.

After making controversial comments in a post-fight interview comparing Ireland to Allah Peter Queally’s contract with Fight Nights Global was ended in the summer of 2018.

Bellator MMA 
With a record of 11-4-1, Queally signed with renowned American mixed martial arts promotion Bellator in 2018 and lost his Bellator debut against fellow Irish fighter Myles Price at Bellator 217 on February 23, 2019, at the 3Arena Dublin, Ireland. The fight was labeled as the "biggest fight in Irish MMA history" by fellow coach John Kavanagh due to the pair of fighters having previously trained under Straight Blast Gyms which Myles Price leaving to American Kickboxing Academy in San Jose, California to help current UFC Lightweight Champion Khabib Nurmagomedov spar in Khabib's scheduled fight against Irish fighter Conor McGregor at UFC 229 on 7 October 2018. The fight ended with a split decision victory for Myles Price.

Queally face Ryan Scope on September 27, 2019, at Bellator 227. Making a come back, Queally defeated Scope via TKO in the second round.

Queally was scheduled to face Brent Primus at Bellator 240. However, Queally was forced to pull out on January 30, 2020, with a LCL tear. He stated that he was ‘absolutely devastated’ to not be featuring at the event.

Queally faced Patricky Pitbull at Bellator 258 on May 7, 2021. After Queally caused a cut on Patricky's forehead from an elbow while was on the bottom, the doctor stopped the fight between rounds after the cutman was unable to stop the bleeding.

Queally rematched against Patricky Pitbull for Bellator 270 on November 5, 2021. On October 6, 2021, Patricky's younger brother and Bellator MMA Lightweight Champion Patrício Pitbull announced he was vacating the title. Patricky Pitbull vs. Peter Queally was then set to be for the vacant Bellator MMA Lightweight Championship. Queally lost the bout via second round technical knockout.

Queally was scheduled to face Kane Mousah on February 25, 2022, at Bellator 275.  However, he was forced to withdraw due to an undisclosed injury.

Queally faced former UFC Lightweight champion Benson Henderson on September 23, 2022, at Bellator Dublin. He lost the bout via unanimous decision.

Queally faced Bryce Logan on February 25, 2023, at Bellator 291. He lost the fight via TKO in the second round.

Mixed martial arts record 

|-
|Loss
|align=center|13–8–1
|Bryce Logan
|TKO (elbow and punches)
|Bellator 291
|
|align=center|2
|align=center|2:32
|Dublin, Ireland
|
|-
|Loss
|align=center|
|Benson Henderson
|Decision (unanimous)
|Bellator 285
|
|align=center|5
|align=center|5:00
|Dublin, Ireland
|
|-
| Loss
| align=center| 13–6–1
| Patricky Freire
| TKO (punches)
| Bellator 270
| 
| align=center| 2
| align=center| 1:05
| Dublin, Ireland
| 
|-
| Win
| align=center|13–5–1
| Patricky Freire
|TKO (doctor stoppage)
|Bellator 258
|
|align=center|2
|align=center|5:00
|Uncasville, Connecticut, United States
|
|-
| Win
| align=center|12–5–1
| Ryan Scope
| TKO (punches) 
| Bellator 227
| 
| align=center|2
| align=center|3:07
| Dublin, Ireland
|
|-
| Loss
| align=center|11–5–1
| Myles Price
| Decision (split)
| Bellator 217
| 
| align=center|3
| align=center|5:00
| Dublin, Ireland
|
|-
| Win
| align=center|11–4–1
| David Khachatryan
| KO (punches) 
| Fight Nights Global 87: Khachatryan vs. Queally
| 
| align=center|1
| align=center|3:52
| Rostov-on-Don, Russia
|
|-
|  Draw
| align=center|10–4–1
| Kuat Khamitov
| Draw (Overturned by Russian MMA Union)
| Fight Nights Global 80: Khamitov vs. Queally
| 
| align=center|5
| align=center|5:00
| Almaty, Kazakhstan
| 
|-
| Loss
| align=center|10–4
| Islam Begidov
| Decision (majority)
| Fight Nights Global 72: Hill vs. Engibaryan
| 
| align=center|3
| align=center|5:00
| Sochi, Russia
|
|-
| Win
| align=center|10–3
| Igor Egorov
| Decision (unanimous) 
| Fight Nights Global 64: Nam vs. Bagautinov
| 
| align=center|3
| align=center|5:00
| Moscow, Russia
|
|-
| Win
| align=center|9–3
| Decky Dalton
| Decision (unanimous) 
| Cage Legacy Fighting Championship 1
| 
| align=center|3
| align=center|5:00
| Drogheda, Ireland
| 
|-
| Loss
| align=center|8–3
| Joe McColgan
| Decision (unanimous)
| BAMMA 26: Saadeh vs. Young
| 
| align=center|3
| align=center|5:00
| Dublin, Ireland
|
|-
|Win
| align=center|8–2
| Nathan Jones
| Decision (unanimous) 
| BAMMA 24: Ireland vs. England
| 
| align=center|3
| align=center|5:00
| Dublin, Ireland
|
|-
| Win
| align=center|7–2
| Roberto Rigamonti
| Decision (unanimous) 
| Venator FC 2: Schiavolin vs. Barnatt
| 
| align=center|3
| align=center|5:00
| Rimini, Italy
|
|-
| Win
| align=center|6–2
| Tomasz Jakubiec
| Decision (unanimous) 
| XCage 8/PLMMA 57
| 
| align=center|3
| align=center|5:00
| Toruń, Poland
|
|-
| Loss
| align=center|5–2
| Igeu Kabesa
| Decision (split)
| Extreme Fighting Championship 40
| 
| align=center|3
| align=center|5:00
| Johannesburg, South Africa
|
|-
| Win
| align=center|5–1
| Francois Kabulu
| Decision (unanimous) 
| Extreme Fighting Championship 35
| 
| align=center|3
| align=center|5:00
| Cape Town, South Africa
|
|-
| Win
| align=center|4–1
| Konrad Iwanowski
| Decision (unanimous) 
| Cage Warriors Fighting Championship 70
| 
| align=center|3
| align=center|5:00
| Dublin, Ireland
|
|-
| Loss
| align=center|3–1
| Chris Boujard
| Decision (unanimous)
| Cage Warriors Fighting Championship 63 
| 
| align=center|3
| align=center|5:00
| Dublin, Ireland
|
|-
| Win
| align=center|3–0
| Diego Coloma
| Decision (unanimous) 
| Cage Contender 16
| 
| align=center|3
| align=center|5:00
| Dublin, Ireland
|
|-
| Win
| align=center|2–0
| Mick Kay
| Decision (unanimous) 
| OMMAC 15: Legacy
| 
| align=center|3
| align=center|5:00
| Liverpool, England
|
|-
| Win
| align=center|1–0
| Kieran O'Donnell
| Decision (unanimous) 
| Cage Contender 12
| 
| align=center|3
| align=center|5:00
| Dublin, Ireland
|

See also 
 List of current Bellator fighters
 List of male mixed martial artists

References

External links 
  

1989 births
Living people
Irish male mixed martial artists
Lightweight mixed martial artists
Mixed martial artists utilizing Brazilian jiu-jitsu
Bellator male fighters
Irish practitioners of Brazilian jiu-jitsu